Ashti Gadchiroli is a village in Chamorshi taluka of Gadchiroli district in Maharashtra state of India.

Demography
The population in Ashti Nokewada village is 5634 as per the survey of census during 2011 by Indian Government with 183 Households in village. Out of 750 population, there are 382 males and 368 females.

Total Scheduled Caste are 245. Total Scheduled Tribe are 61. Literates are 617 of which males are 318 and Females are 299. There are 133 Illiterates.

Transport
Nearest railway station from village is Sirpur , Wihirgaon, Mukudi and Wirur.

References

Villages in Gadchiroli district